Branishte Peak is the ice-covered peak rising to 1888 m in the southeastern portion of Gromshin Heights on the east side of northern Sentinel Range in Ellsworth Mountains, Antarctica.  It surmounts Yamen Glacier to the north, Rutford Ice Stream to the east and Vicha Glacier to the southwest.

The peak is named after the settlement of Branishte in Northeastern Bulgaria.

Location
US mapping in 1961.

See also
 Mountains in Antarctica

Maps
 Newcomer Glacier.  Scale 1:250 000 topographic map.  Reston, Virginia: US Geological Survey, 1961.
 Antarctic Digital Database (ADD). Scale 1:250000 topographic map of Antarctica. Scientific Committee on Antarctic Research (SCAR). Since 1993, regularly updated.

Notes

References
 Branishte Peak. SCAR Composite Gazetteer of Antarctica.
 Bulgarian Antarctic Gazetteer. Antarctic Place-names Commission. (details in Bulgarian, basic data in English)

External links
 Branishte Peak. Copernix satellite image

Ellsworth Mountains
Bulgaria and the Antarctic
Mountains of Ellsworth Land